Tevfik Akbasli (born 1962) is a Turkish composer.

Studies
One of the most acknowledged 71 Turkish Composers, Akbasli is the son of businessman Samim Akbasli of Izmir. He spent his childhood and elementary school years in Yesilkoy, Istanbul until his family moved to Izmir. He attended Dokuz Eylül University’s Vocal Studies and Opera Division and studied with names like Sevda Aydan, Suat Taser, Kamran Ince and percussionist Oktay Aykoc while playing drums at various clubs in Istanbul and Izmir.  He graduated from Vocal Studies in 1982 as the first chorister to the newly founded Izmir State Opera and Ballet.  In 1985, he passed the orchestra exam and crossed over as a percussion artist.  However, due to shortage of staff, he served at both the choir and the orchestra for a short period of time.  Between 1986 and 1991, he went to the US and studied percussion instruments as well as theory, harmony, composition and improvisation at the Berklee School of Music in vibraphone virtuoso Gary Burton’s Percussion Department with Professor Ed Saindon and pianist - composer Aydin Esen.

Career
He turned to composition in 1990.  He succeeded at the position placement exam and made Assistant Principal Timpanist at the State Opera Orchestra. He composed an array of pieces from opera to musical for children, from modern dance music to chamber music.  Upon the addition of his first opera, The Sacred Chest to the repertoire of The Ankara State Opera and Ballet, he moved to Ankara and continued his career as an orchestra artist.  The chamber music piece he was commissioned to compose, Autumn in Ankara was performed in Germany in 1994.  He was awarded the Aziz Nesin Grand Prize by the Cagdas Yasami Destekleme Dernegi for the music he composed for the Giordano Bruno play in 1996, when he was also awarded the Special Jury Award by the Eczacıbasi Contest Jury for his symphonic poem, Turkiye.  In 1998, he was again awarded the third place for his symphonic poem Dixi et Salvavi Animam Meam at the Eczacibasi’s composition contest, whereas in 2000, he was the first prize winner of the same contest for his orchestra suite called Rebirth which also came out as a CD and performed in the opening ceremony of the International Music Festival of Ephesus.  Between 2000 and 2001, he attended workshops and master classes in contemporary American and film music in New York where his modern dance music Jamaican Pond Sunsets was performed.  He joined the Istanbul State Opera and Ballet in 2002. His Ballet of 2003, The Conquest was awarded the Special Jury Award at a National Composition Contest by the Ministry of Culture.

In his work, Tevfik Akbasli opted for being comprehensible without lowering artistic and aesthetic levels and epitomized a lively, straightforward expression that embodies the indisputable reign of melody.  Thanks to his three decades of performance history, he has observed that all masterpieces that are known to be classics this day are those that easily captivate the listener without being tiresome no matter how structurally complicated they are and that consist of small but perfect pieces that can be mumbled effortlessly.  He endeavored to follow the same path as those classics both as composer and performer.
MSG is the copyright holder to his work.

His Major Work and Awards:

Orchestra
 1995 – Why? (Concerto for Percussion and Orchestra) performed by Presidential Symphony Orchestra and Izmir State Symphony Orchestra
 1996 - Turkiye (Symphonic Poem) - Eczacıbasi National Composition Contest - Special Jury Award
 1997 - A Tribute to Freddie Mercury - A Symphonic Rock Project with Opera Chorus - Ankara
 1998 - Dixi et Salvavi Animam Meam (Symphonic Poem) Eczacıbasi National Composition Contest - Third Place Award
 2000 - Rebirth (Suit for Orchestra) Eczacıbasi National Composition Contest – First Prize Winner
performed by Bilkent Symphony Orchestra and Istanbul State Opera and Ballet
 2004 – Stay! (Music for Orchestra)
 2008 - Wake up, Resist and Give in to the Light

Opera, Ballet, Modern Dance and the other Stage Works
 1993 - The Sacred Chest (Opera in 2 Acts)  1993 / 1994 Ankara State Opera and Ballet
 1993 - Dear Peace (Musical for Children in 2 Acts) 1993–1997 Izmir State Opera and Ballet / 1998–2000 Ankara State Opera and Ballet
 1995 - Dinosours Were Young Also (Musical in 2 Acts)
 1996 - Giordano Bruno (Music for a Play) - Aziz Nesin Prize - 1996 - Ankara State Theater
 1997 - Mutation (Music for Modern Dance) 1997 - 1998 - Modern Dance Company - Ankara
 1998 - A Little Family Matter (Play in 2 Acts)
 1999 - Amber (Opera in 2 Acts)
 2001 - Jamaica Pond Sunsets (Music for Modern Dance) 2001 - New York
 2003 - Fetih - The Conquest (Music for Ballet) Ministry of Culture National Composition Contest – Special Jury Award
 2010 - Kosem Sultan (Ballet) 2011 - Izmir State Opera and Ballet
 2012 - Suleiman the Magnificent (Opera) 2013 - Izmir State Opera and Ballet

Chamber music
 1994 - Autumn in Ankara (Music for Oboe, Violin, Viola and Cello) 1994 – Zigburg - Germany
 2004 - Between Us (Music for Flute, Viola ve Cello) 2004 - Istanbul

Discography
 2001 - Nejat F. Eczacıbasi National Composition Contest (1996–1998 – 2000) First Prize Winners’ CD
Bilkent Symphony Orchestra Conducted by Erol Erdinc

 2007 - Beyaz Melek – The White Angel - The Original Motion Picture Soundtrack
The City of Prague Philharmonic Orchestra and Opera Chorus Conducted by Adam Klemens

 2009 - Gunesi Gordum – I Saw the Sun - The Original Motion Picture Soundtrack
Prague Filmharmonic Orchestra and Opera Chorus Conducted by Adam Klemens

 2010 - Gecenin Kanatlari – Wings of the Night - The Original Motion Picture Soundtrack
Prague Filmharmonic Orchestra and Opera Chorus Conducted by Adam Klemens

 2011 - New York' ta Bes Minare – Five Minarets in New York - The Original Motion Picture Soundtrack
Prague Filmharmonic Orchestra and Opera Chorus Conducted by Adam Klemens

 2011 - Hur Adam – Free Man - The Original Motion Picture Soundtrack
Prague Filmharmonic Orchestra and Opera Chorus Conducted by Adam Klemens

 2012 - Sessiz Sinema – Silent Movie] - Funda Arar (Orchestrator)
The City of Prague Philharmonic Orchestra Conducted by Adam Klemens

 2015 - Mucize – The Miracle - The Original Motion Picture Soundtrack
Prague Filmharmonic Orchestra and Opera Chorus Conducted by Adam Klemens

 2015 - Sevimli Tehlikeli – Cute and Dangerous - The Original Motion Picture Soundtrack
Prague Filmharmonic Orchestra and Opera Chorus Conducted by Adam Klemens

 2015 - Senden Bana Kalan – What's Left of You - The Original Motion Picture Soundtrack
Prague Filmharmonic Orchestra and Opera Chorus Conducted by Adam Klemens

 2016 - Kendime Iyi Bakmadim – Didn't Take Care of Myself - Toygar Isikli (Orchestrator)
The City of Prague Philharmonic Orchestra Conducted by Richard Hain

References
 71 Turkish Composers by Evin İlyasoğlu – Pan Publishing / Turkiye, 2007

Turkish composers
Living people
1962 births